Neus Ávila Bonastra (born 26 July 1971), known as Neus Ávila, is a former professional tennis player from Spain.

Biography
Ávila was a bronze medalist in the women's doubles at the 1991 Mediterranean Games in Athens.

In 1993 she won ITF singles titles in Bilbao and Vigo, both $25,000 tournaments, with her ranking climbing over 100 places by the end of the year.

She competed in the main draw of several WTA Tour events in 1994, including a quarter-final appearance at the Internazionali Femminili di Palermo.

In 1995 her ranking peaked at 105 in the world, earning her direct entry into both the French Open and Wimbledon.

A member of Spain's Fed Cup winning campaign in 1995, Ávila featured in the quarter-final tie against Bulgaria. She partnered Virginia Ruano Pascual in a dead rubber doubles tie, which they lost to the Maleeva sisters, Katerina and Magdalena.

She played her final professional tournament in 1997.

ITF finals

Singles: 7 (5-2)

Doubles: 1 (0–1)

Notes

References

External links
 
 
 

1971 births
Living people
Spanish female tennis players
Mediterranean Games bronze medalists for Spain
Competitors at the 1991 Mediterranean Games
Mediterranean Games medalists in tennis